Bertil "Berra" Lundell (6 September 1908 – 11 July 1996) was a Swedish ice hockey, football and bandy player, known for representing Hammarby IF in all three sports.

He represented the Swedish national team in the men's hockey tournament at the 1936 Winter Olympics.

Athletic career

Ice hockey
In 1929, Lundell started to play hockey with Hammarby IF in Elitserien, Sweden's top tier.

He won five Swedish championships – in 1932, 1933, 1936, 1937 and 1942 – with Hammarby, the club's first domestic titles in its history.

He retired from playing hockey in 1942. In total, Lundell made 183 competitive appearances for Hammarby IF, scoring 28 goals.

Lundell won 27 caps for the Swedish national team, and represented his country at four major tournaments, such as the 1936 Winter Olympics. He is a recipient of the honorary award Stora Grabbars Märke, which is handed out by Swedish Ice Hockey Association.

Football
Lundell started his football career as a youngster at local club IK Mode in Stockholm.

Between 1929 and 1941, Lundell made 210 league appearances as a solid defender for Hammarby IF, mostly in the Swedish second tier Division 2.

In 1939–40, Hammarby played one season in Allsvenskan, the domestic top league, with Lundell featuring in all 22 fixtures, but was relegated immediately.

Bandy
In 1928, Lundell took up bandy and helped establish Hammarby IF among the top bandy clubs in Sweden at the beginning of the 1930s.

References

External links
 

1908 births
1996 deaths
Ice hockey players at the 1936 Winter Olympics
Olympic ice hockey players of Sweden
Ice hockey people from Stockholm
Swedish ice hockey players
Hammarby Fotboll players
Hammarby Hockey (1921–2008) players
Hammarby IF Bandy players
Swedish bandy players
Allsvenskan players
Swedish footballers
Association football defenders